Euarestella iphionae is a species of tephritid or fruit flies in the genus Euarestella of the family Tephritidae.

Distribution
Egypt, Sudan, Israel, Arabia, Iran.

References

Tephritinae
Insects described in 1924
Diptera of Africa
Diptera of Asia